= Rabbit Run, Lexington =

Neighborhood in Lexington, Kentucky

Coordinates: 38.005°N 84.563°W

Rabbit Run is a neighborhood in southwestern Lexington, Kentucky, United States. Its boundaries are Harrodsburg Road to the west, Man O War Boulevard to the south, and a combination that includes both Bleinheim Way and Gladman Way to the east.

Neighborhood Statistics

- Population in 2000: 1,330
- Land area: 0.418 square miles (1.08 km^{2})
- Population density: 3,180-square-mile (8,200 km^{2})
- Median income in 2000: $95,599
